Enallagma laterale, the New England bluet, is a species of narrow-winged damselfly in the family Coenagrionidae. It is found in North America.

The IUCN conservation status of Enallagma laterale is "LC", least concern, with no immediate threat to the species' survival. The population is stable.

References

Further reading

 

Coenagrionidae
Articles created by Qbugbot
Insects described in 1895